George Cochran or Cochrane may refer to:
George Cochran (baseball) (1889–1960), Major League Baseball player
George M. Cochran (1912–2011), Virginia State Supreme Court Justice
George Cochrane (ice hockey) (1881–1952), ice hockey player
George Cochrane (footballer) (1877–1914), Australian rules football player
George Cochrane (politician) (1762–?), Scottish soldier and politician

See also
George Cochrane Hazelton (1832–1922), U.S. representative from Wisconsin
John George Cochrane (1781–1852), Scottish bibliographer